The Gustavus G. Prescott House is a historic house in Somerville, Massachusetts.  It is a rare five-bay center-entry Greek Revival house to survive in East Somerville.  The -story wood-frame house was built in the 1840s, along with a matching building at 69–71, which has lost historical integrity.  The owner, Gustavus Prescott, was a Charlestown merchant who is said to have operated an inn on the premises.

The house was listed on the National Register of Historic Places in 1989.

See also
National Register of Historic Places listings in Somerville, Massachusetts

References

Houses on the National Register of Historic Places in Somerville, Massachusetts